Oldenburg may also refer to:

Places
Mount Oldenburg, Ellsworth Land, Antarctica
Oldenburg (city), an independent city in Lower Saxony, Germany
Oldenburg (district), a district historically in Oldenburg Free State and now in Lower Saxony
Oldenburg in Holstein, a town in Schleswig-Holstein, Germany
Oldenburg-Land, an association of municipalities near Oldenburg in Holstein
Oldenburg, Indiana, a town in the United States
Oldenburg, Texas, a settlement in the United States

Historical
Bishopric of Oldenburg (970–1160), a bishopric that became the Prince-bishopric of Lübeck, now in Schleswig--Holstein
County of Oldenburg (1091–1774), a state of the Holy Roman Empire, now in Lower Saxony
Duchy of Oldenburg (1774–1810), a state of the Holy Roman Empire
Grand Duchy of Oldenburg (1814–1918), a state of the German Confederation and Empire
Free State of Oldenburg (1918–1946), a state of the Weimar Republic and Nazi Germany
Oldenburg Land, a historical region in Lower Saxony, covering the former free state

Ships
 German corvette Oldernburg (F263), a Braunschweig-class (Type 130) corvette commissioned in 2013
 MS Oldenburg, a British passenger ferry
 SMS Oldenburg, a World War I battleship
 SMS Oldenburg (1884), an armored coastal defense ship of the German Imperial Navy
 SS Möwe (1914) or Oldenburg, a freighter and former auxiliary cruiser
 Suomen Joutsen or Oldenburg, a full-rigged ship

People
 Claes Oldenburg (1929–2022), Swedish-born American sculptor
 Oldenburg (surname)

Other uses
the Oldenburg or Oldenburger, a horse breed from Lower Saxony
House of Oldenburg, North German noble family, kings of Denmark
University of Oldenburg, Oldenburg, Germany

See also
Duchess of Oldenburg (apple), a Russian apple cultivar also known as Oldenburg
Geheimrat Dr. Oldenburg, a German apple cultivar also known as Oldenburg
Oldenberg, a surname
Oldenburg Baby, an aborted child who survived